Vienna 1910 is a 1943 German biographical film directed by Emerich Walter Emo and starring Rudolf Forster, Heinrich George, and Lil Dagover. It is based on the life of Mayor of Vienna Karl Lueger. Its antisemitic content led to it being banned by the Allied Occupation forces following the Second World War.

Cast

Bibliography

External links

1943 films
1940s biographical drama films
1940s political drama films
1940s historical drama films
German biographical drama films
German political drama films
German historical drama films
1940s German-language films
Films directed by E. W. Emo
Films of Nazi Germany
Films set in 1910
Films set in Vienna
Films shot in Vienna
Nazi antisemitic propaganda films
German black-and-white films
1943 drama films
Films set in Austria-Hungary
1940s German films